Frankel Leo Synagogue is located on the Buda side of Budapest, Hungary (2nd district, Frankel Leo street 49). It is a Neolog synagogue which is the local mainstream of the Jewish community. The congregation and prayers similar to the Conservative/Masorti but without being egalitarian. Men and women sit separated but without mechitzah. They follow the Nusach Ashkenaz.

History
The synagogue was built in 1888. In the 1920s a block building was built around it to protect it and to serve as a community building. During World War II, the synagogue was used as a stable and the residents were all killed. Today the Jewish community owns only one apartment in the building and gentiles live in the building. There is a memorial in the yard with the names of the Jewish families who were deported from the house in 1944.

Community 
There is a vibrant Jewish community life in the Frankel synagogue, included Family Kabalat Shabbat, Sunday School, adult educational programs, BBYO youth movement for teens, holiday celebrations and cultural events serve the needs of the members. About 350 young families and 150 elders belong to the community.

References

External links
 

Ashkenazi Jewish culture in Hungary
Ashkenazi synagogues
2nd District of Budapest
Neolog Judaism synagogues
Synagogues in Budapest